Frederick Oscar Bratschi (January 16, 1892 – January 10, 1962) was a left fielder in Major League Baseball between  and . Bratschi batted and threw right-handed. He was born in Alliance, Ohio.
 
Bratschi was 29 years old when he reached the majors with the Chicago White Sox in 1921, spending one year with them before moving to the Boston Red Sox during 1926-27. In parts of three seasons, he posted a .276 batting average (54-for-196) with 12 runs, 19 RBI,10 doubles, and one triple with no home runs in 89 games played.

Bratschi died in Massillon, Ohio, at the age of 69, by accidentally drinking battery acid.

External links

Retrosheet
{https://sabr.org/bioproj/person/fred-bratschi/}

Boston Red Sox players
Chicago White Sox players
Major League Baseball left fielders
People from Alliance, Ohio
Baseball players from Ohio
1892 births
1962 deaths
Accidental deaths in Ohio
Deaths by poisoning